The eleventh season of the American reality television series Food Network Star premiered June 7, 2015  on Food Network. Food Network chefs Bobby Flay and Giada de Laurentiis returned to the series as judges, with Alton Brown not returning for undisclosed reasons. This season also continued the inclusion of Star Salvation, a six-week webseries that featured the most recently eliminated contestant competing against the remaining previously eliminated contestants for a chance to re-enter the main Food Network Star competition.

This season also returned to the practice of the winner of the competition being chosen by the Food Network staff, rather than by viewers as in the three previous seasons.

Contestants

Winner
 Eddie Jackson – Richardson, Texas

Runners-up
 Jay Ducote – Baton Rouge, Louisiana
 Dominick "Dom" Tesoriero – Staten Island, New York

Eliminated
(In order of elimination)
 Christina Fitzgerald –St. Louis, Missouri 
 Matthew Grunwald –Scottsdale, Arizona 
 Sita Lewis – New York, New York
 Rosa Graziano – Los Angeles, California
 Rue Rusike – Brooklyn, New York
 Emilia Cirker – Reston, Virginia
 Michelle Karam – Santa Barbara, California (withdrew)
 Dominick "Dom" Tesoriero – Staten Island, New York (Returned to competition after winning Star Salvation)
 Alex McCoy   – Washington D.C.
 Arnold Myint – Nashville, Tennessee

Contestant progress

 (WINNER) The contestant won the competition and became the next "Food Network Star".
 (RUNNER-UP) The contestant made it to the finale, but did not win.
 (WIN) The contestant won the challenge for that week.
 (RETURNED) The contestant won Star Salvation and returned to the main competition.
 (HIGH) The contestant was one of the selection committee's favorites for that week.
 (IN) The contestant performed well enough to move on to the next week.  
 (LOW) The contestant was one of the selection committee's three or four least favorites for that week, but was not eliminated.
 (OUT) The contestant was the selection committee's least favorite for that week, and was eliminated.
 (QUIT) The contestant voluntarily left the competition.

Star Salvation
This season of Star Salvation was hosted by Iron Chef Alex Guarnaschelli and season 7 winner Jeff Mauro.    

: Having withdrawn from the competition, Michelle did not compete in Star Salvation this week.

 (WIN) The chef won Star Salvation and returned to the main competition.
 (IN) The chef continued in the competition.
 (OUT) The chef lost in that week's Star Salvation and was eliminated from the competition.

Episodes

Week 1: Food Star Food Festival
Top 3: Jay, Eddie and Arnold
Bottom 3: Dom, Matthew and Christina
Eliminated: Christina

Week 2: Savory Baking
Top 2: Eddie and Arnold
Bottom 3: Emilia, Sita and  Matthew
Eliminated: Matthew

Week 3: Trendy Dinner
Top 2: Dom and Arnold
Winner: Michelle
Bottom 3: Eddie, Rosa and Sita
Eliminated: Sita

Week 4: 4th of July Cookout
Winners: Eddie, Arnold and Alex
Bottom 3: Dom, Michelle and Rosa
Eliminated: Rosa

Week 5: The Perfect Match
Top 4: Eddie, Alex, Jay and Emilia
Bottom 4: Arnold, Dom, Michelle and Rue
Eliminated: Rue

Week 6: Improv
Top 2: Eddie and Jay
Bottom 3: Alex, Dom and Emilia
Eliminated: Emilia

Week 7: Food Truck Throwdown
Top 2: Jay and Arnold
Bottom 4: Dom, Eddie, Michelle and  Alex
Withdrew: Michelle
  Michelle chose to withdraw from the competition to be with her family. She did not compete in Star Salvation.

Week 8: Lifestyle Brand
Top 2: Jay and  Alex
Bottom 3: Arnold, Eddie and  Dom
Eliminated: Dom

Week 9: Live TV
Top 2: Eddie and Jay
Bottom 2: Arnold and  Alex
Eliminated: Alex

Week 10: Dish of a Lifetime and Pilots
Top: Jay
Bottom 2: Eddie and  Arnold
Eliminated: Arnold
 Dom returned to the competition, having won Star Salvation.

Week 11: We Have a Winner
Winner: Eddie
Show on Food Network: BBQ Blitz
Runners-up: Dom and Jay

References

External links
 
 

Food Network Star